Kirn station is a railway station in the municipality of Kirn, located in the Bad Kreuznach district in Rhineland-Palatinate, Germany.

References

Railway stations in Rhineland-Palatinate
Buildings and structures in Bad Kreuznach (district)